The 4th Platino Awards was presented at Caja Mágica in Madrid, Spain on July 22, 2017, to honour the best in Ibero-American films of 2016.

A Monster Calls received the most nominations with seven.

Winners and nominees

Major awards

Honorary Platino
 Edward James Olmos

Films with multiple nominations and awards 

The following films received multiple nominations:

References

External links
 Official site

3
Platino Awards
2017 in Madrid